Samma gamla visa ("The Same Old Tune") was the 2003 edition of Sveriges Radio's Christmas Calendar.

Plot
At school, 11 years old Amanda Axelsson has to learn the old tune "Ack snö, ack snö" by heart. She also learns it backwards and strange, magical, things begin to happen.

References
 

2003 radio programme debuts
2003 radio programme endings
Sveriges Radio's Christmas Calendar